Morituri—Latin for "those who are about to die"—can refer to:

 Morituri (1948 film), a German film, featuring Klaus Kinski's onscreen debut.
 Morituri (1965 film), starring Marlon Brando and Yul Brynner.
 Morituri (2007 film), a 2007 French-Algerian film by Okacha Touita, from the homonymous book by Yasmina Khadra
 Strikeforce: Morituri, a Marvel Comics comic book series
 Morituri, an Open Source CD ripper that aims for accuracy over speed

See also
 Morituris, a 2011 Italian horror film